Naburn Hospital was a mental health facility in Naburn, North Yorkshire, England.

History
Acres House, a property dating back to 1774, and its associated farmland were acquired in 1899 for the purposes of building an asylum. The facility, which was designed by Alfred Creer using a compact arrow layout, opened as York Borough Asylum in April 1906. After Naburn Lodge Farm was acquired in 1913, further expansion of the hospital became possible. It became the York City Mental Hospital in 1927 and joined the National Health Service as Naburn Hospital in 1948.

After the introduction of Care in the Community in the early 1980s, the hospital went into a period of decline and closed in February 1988. Most of the hospital buildings were subsequently demolished and the site was redeveloped as the York Designer Outlet Centre. However Acres House survives.

References

Hospitals in North Yorkshire
Defunct hospitals in England
Hospitals established in 1906
1906 establishments in England
1988 disestablishments in England
Hospitals disestablished in 1988
Former psychiatric hospitals in England